A paper lantern is a lantern made of thin, brightly colored paper. Paper lanterns come in various shapes and sizes, as well as various methods of construction. In their simplest form, they are simply a paper bag with a candle placed inside, although more complicated lanterns consist of a collapsible bamboo or metal frame of hoops covered with tough paper.

Origin
Paper lanterns are likely derived from earlier lanterns that used other types of translucent material like silk, horn, or animal skin. The material covering was used to prevent the flame in the lantern from being extinguished by wind, while still retaining its use as a light source. Papermaking technology originated from China from at least AD 105 during the Eastern Han Dynasty, but it is unknown exactly when paper became used for lanterns. Poems about paper lanterns start to appear in Chinese history at around the 6th century. Paper lanterns were common by the Tang Dynasty (AD 690–705), and it was during this period that the first annual lantern festival was established. From China, it was spread to neighboring cultures in East Asia, Southeast Asia, and South Asia.

Types
There are three general types of paper lanterns, they are:
Hanging lantern - the basic type of paper lantern used for illumination. They are meant to be carried, hung, or mounted on stands.
Sky lantern - a small hot air balloon made of paper, with an opening at the bottom where a small fire is suspended. Also known as "flying lanterns", "sky candles" or "fire balloons."
Water lantern - paper lanterns that float on the surface of water.

By region
In addition to everyday usage as a light source in the past, paper lanterns are commonly associated with festivals in East Asian, Southeast Asian, and South Asian cultures.

East Asia

China & Taiwan

Paper lanterns are called Dēnglóng in China.

Japan

In Japan the traditional styles include bonbori and chōchin and there is a special style of lettering called chōchin moji used to write on them.

Southeast Asia

Philippines

In the Philippines, a traditional paper lantern is the parol, which is regarded an iconic symbol of Filipino Christmas. Traditionally constructed using bamboo and Japanese paper, modern parols have been made using other materials such as plastic, metal, and capiz shells. Its most-common form is a five-pointed star, although it can come in various shapes and sizes.

Dating back to the Spanish colonial period of the Philippines, parols are a traditional part of the Panunulúyan pageant in the nine-day Christmas Novena procession leading up to the Simbang Gabi (midnight mass). It was initially rectangular or oblong in shape but eventually came to be made in various shapes. It became standardized to a five-pointed star (symbolizing the Star of Bethlehem) during the American colonial period.

Thailand

During the Yi Peng festival of Thailand, some people also decorate their houses, gardens, and temples with khom fai, intricately shaped paper lanterns which take on different forms. Khom thue are lanterns which are carried around hanging from a stick, khom khwaen are the hanging lanterns, and khom pariwat, which are placed at temples and which revolve due to the heat of the candle inside. The most elaborate Yi Peng celebrations can be seen in Chiang Mai, the ancient capital of the former Lanna kingdom, where now both Loi Krathong and Yi Peng are celebrated at the same time resulting in lights floating on the waters, lights hanging from trees/buildings or standing on walls, and lights floating in the sky. The tradition of Yi Peng was also adopted by certain parts of Laos during the 16th century.

Thousands of sky lanterns called khom loi are also released annually during the Yi Peng festival. However, this is a relatively new addition to the festival, only dating back to the first decade of the 21st century as part of tourism development.

Vietnam
Two traditional festivals in Vietnam have prominent roles for lanterns: 
Vu Lan on the 15th day of the seventh lunar month. Buddhist temples traditionally would host the release of floating water lanterns down river courses on small paper crafts with sticks of incense and written prayers.

Tết Trung Thu, (Mid-Autumn festival) also known as the Children's Festival (Tết Nhi Đồng) on the 15th day of the eighth lunar month. Children would parade in the streets with lit lanterns (rước đèn) with accompanying music and songs after sunset. The lanterns in this case are whimsical with a multitude of shapes and themes like fish, star... The lanterns are typically in transparent colored papers.

In addition to the above two festivals, paper lanterns are also hung by Vietnamese people on the occasion of the Tết Nguyên Đán to look forward to a good new year.

Paper lanterns are also used to attract visitors, for example, Hoian city, a famous tourist destination of Vietnam, often hangs paper lanterns throughout the year to attract tourists.

South Asia

Sri Lanka

Colorful paper lanterns called vesak kuudu are hung outside houses during the Buddhist festival of Vesak.

Americas

United States

Placing candles or tea lights in a succession of small paper bags (known as luminarias or farolitos) is a common Christmas tradition in New Mexico. The tradition originated from the parol paper lanterns of the Philippines brought over to the Americas during the colonial period.

Europe
During the Festa della Rificolona held in Florence, Italy, children carry colourful paper lanterns through the streets of the city.

In Germany, Austria, Switzerland and other German-speaking and some Dutch-speaking parts of Europe there is a tradition of the Sankt-Martins-Umzug (Sint-Maarten in Dutch), during which children parade with paper lanterns that are traditionally handmade.

In photography
High-wattage paper lanterns are commonly used in lighting for motion picture productions. Commonly referred to as "China balls", they provide soft, edgeless light to a scene.

See also
 Color in Chinese culture
 Kamifūsen
 Lantern
 Sky lantern
 Types of Indian lamps
 Luminaria

References

External links 
 

Chinese inventions
Chinese New Year
Light fixtures
Paper products